Thomas Krief (born 5 June 1993) is a French freestyle skier. He won a bronze medal at the 2013 FIS Freestyle World Ski Championships.

References

External links
 FIS-Ski.com Profile

1993 births
Living people
French male freestyle skiers
Freestyle skiers at the 2014 Winter Olympics
Freestyle skiers at the 2018 Winter Olympics
Olympic freestyle skiers of France
Sportspeople from Grenoble